Jeffrey Sean Lehman (born August 1, 1956) is an American scholar, lawyer and academic administrator who is the vice chancellor of New York University Shanghai. Known as an advocate for the role of universities in globalization, he previously served as chancellor and founding dean of the Peking University School of Transnational Law in Shenzhen, China, president of Cornell University, dean of the University of Michigan Law School, and chairman of Internet2. 

On April 14, 2018, Lehman was one of forty named "The Most Influential Foreign Experts During 40 Years of China’s Reform and Opening-Up” at the 16th Conference on International Exchange of Professionals, for his work in higher education in China.

Early life and education
Born August 1, 1956 in Bronxville, New York, Lehman earned an undergraduate degree in mathematics from Cornell University. While a student at Cornell, Lehman was active in the Alpha Phi Omega fraternity and co-wrote the book 1000 Ways to Win Monopoly Games, with future tech entrepreneur Jay S. Walker. He spent his junior year participating in the Sweet Briar College Junior Year in France. He went on to receive a J.D. and a M.P.P. from the University of Michigan, where he served as editor-in-chief of Michigan Law Review.

Career
After graduating, he served as law clerk for Chief Judge Frank M. Coffin of the United States Court of Appeals for the First Circuit, and then for Associate Justice John Paul Stevens of the U.S. Supreme Court. After practicing law in Washington, D.C., Lehman returned to the University of Michigan in 1987 to join the law school faculty. He also taught as a visiting professor at the Yale Law School and the University of Paris.

University of Michigan Law School dean
In 1994, Lehman became Dean of the University of Michigan Law School], where he was at that time the youngest law school dean in the U.S. During his deanship, Michigan became the first U.S. law school to require all J.D. students to complete a course in transnational law. The school also drew attention for initiatives in public service and the teaching of legal writing. From 2001 to 2003, he served as president of the American Law Deans Association.
 
Along with then-University President Lee Bollinger, Lehman received national attention in the 2003 Supreme Court case of Grutter v. Bollinger in which the University largely succeeded in defending the law school's affirmative action admissions policies.

Cornell University president
In 2003, Lehman became the 11th president of Cornell University. As president of Cornell, he oversaw effective large-scale fundraising efforts.  In 2004, Cornell ranked third in the nation in university fundraising (behind only Harvard and Stanford), raising over US$375 million that year alone.  Lehman was also known for prominently promoting his "three themes": "life in the age of the genome," "wisdom in the age of digital information" and "sustainability in the age of development." These themes arose from intensive engagement with faculty, students and Cornellians during his first year, a process that won him great respect across campus. Lehman pioneered the concept of a "transnational" university, by opening a medical campus in Doha, Qatar and cooperative education and research arrangements with universities in China, India and Singapore.

In 2005, Lehman resigned from the presidency, citing irreconcilable differences with the leadership of the Cornell Board of Trustees — an announcement that came as a surprise to most of the Cornell community and to outsiders. Lehman's tenure was by far the shortest of any Cornell President until the death of Elizabeth Garrett in 2016.  Specific reasoning for Lehman's departure has been highly secretive and subject to occasional debate within the Cornell faculty and alumni communities.

Lehman remained a member of the Cornell Law School faculty until 2012. In 2007, Cornell published An Optimistic Heart, a book of speeches that Lehman wrote and delivered as president.

Peking University School of Transnational Law dean
After serving as a senior scholar at the Woodrow Wilson International Center for Scholars in Washington, D.C., Lehman became the chancellor and founding dean of the Peking University School of Transnational Law, located on the university's Shenzhen campus. The school is modeled on the American style of law school, and it is intended that graduates will be eligible to sit for the New York bar exam.
On Sept. 29, 2011, Lehman was a recipient  of the 2011 Friendship Award, China’s highest award for foreign experts who have made outstanding contributions to China’s economic and social progress.

NYU Shanghai founding vice chancellor
In April 2012, it was announced that Lehman would be steering the new institution jointly with Yu Lizhong, former president of New York University's local partner, East China Normal University. "Yu will be the chancellor and will play a major role in government relations. ... Lehman, as vice chancellor, will have free rein in academic affairs. The first students will arrive in fall 2013, the majority of them from China." In the time from summer, 2012 until opening, Lehman is dividing his time between New York and Shanghai.

In November 2019, Lehman was charged by a faculty member with discrimination for failing to provide a safe and accessible environment. Restrooms at NYU Shanghai labeled as being for people with disabilities do not have basic accessibility features such as accessible flush handles. The charge is currently pending investigation by the EEOC.

Other professional activities
From 2007 to 2011, Lehman chaired the board of Internet2, an advanced not-for-profit U.S. networking consortium led by members from the research and education communities, industry, and government.  

Lehman was an independent director of Infosys, Limited, a NASDAQ listed technology company headquartered in Bangalore, India.  He attracted attention in India in his role as chair of the nominations committee that recommended the successor to the company’s founder N. R. Narayana Murthy, who had been appointed to the Cornell Board of Trustees during Lehman's tenure as President.  He also served as chair of the board of the company’s American subsidiary, Infosys Public Services. Lehman abruptly resigned from Infosys in August 2017 following a whistleblower complaint into the company's conduct, including charges of nepotistic dealings by Lehman himself, mirroring his sudden resignation from Cornell years earlier.

See also 
 List of law clerks of the Supreme Court of the United States (Seat 4)

References

External links
 Jeffrey Lehman personal website
 Lehman at Peking University School of Transnational Law, Shenzhen 
 Cornell Presidency: Jeffrey S. Lehman
 Cornell University Library Presidents Exhibition: Jeffrey Sean Lehman (Presidency; Inauguration)
 LegalInsight.net audio: A Conversation with Jeffrey Lehman
 Inside Higher Ed: "Sudden Departure at Cornell"
 Lehman named Cornell President

1956 births
Living people
Cornell University alumni
Law clerks of the Supreme Court of the United States
Presidents of Cornell University
Academic staff of Peking University
People from Bronxville, New York
American expatriate academics
American expatriates in China
University of Michigan Law School alumni
American chief executives of education-related organizations
Taubman College of Architecture and Urban Planning alumni